The CONCACAF Cup (officially the CONCACAF Cup presented by Scotiabank for sponsorship reasons) was an international soccer play-off match to determine CONCACAF's entry into the 2017 FIFA Confederations Cup in Russia. The 2013 CONCACAF Gold Cup winner United States played against the 2015 CONCACAF Gold Cup winner Mexico on October 10, 2015, at the Rose Bowl in Pasadena, United States.

Mexico won the match 3–2 after extra time, therefore qualifying for the 2017 FIFA Confederations Cup.

Background
Even though the CONCACAF Gold Cup takes place on a biennial basis, under previous guidelines prior to 2013, only the winners of the Gold Cup that was held two years before the FIFA Confederations Cup qualified as CONCACAF's representative. For example, Mexico won the 2011 CONCACAF Gold Cup and qualified for the 2013 FIFA Confederations Cup. This, in turn, lowered the prestige of the alternating tournament, with CONCACAF teams fielding weaker rosters in the Gold Cup that was held on the same year as the Confederations Cup because the result would have no bearing on qualification for the Confederations Cup. Many teams that were also involved in qualifying for the FIFA World Cup during that year put less focus on the Gold Cup.

CONCACAF announced the introduction of a play-off match on April 5, 2013. Starting from the 2017 FIFA Confederations Cup, the CONCACAF representative would be decided by a play-off between the two CONCACAF Gold Cup winners prior to the Confederations Cup. Then CONCACAF President Jeffrey Webb stated this "will allow the Champion of every single Gold Cup edition to have the same competitive opportunity to represent CONCACAF at the international level." In the case where the same national team wins both Gold Cup tournaments, no play-off is played, and the team qualifies directly to the Confederations Cup.

Following CONCACAF's decision to end their affiliation with Traffic Sports USA due to the 2015 FIFA corruption case, Major League Soccer's sister company Soccer United Marketing was chosen as commercial representative for the match.

Qualified teams
United States qualified for the play-off by winning the 2013 CONCACAF Gold Cup, after beating Panama 1–0 in the 2013 CONCACAF Gold Cup Final on July 28, 2013.
Mexico qualified for the play-off by winning the 2015 CONCACAF Gold Cup, after beating Jamaica 3–1 in the 2015 CONCACAF Gold Cup Final on July 26, 2015.

Format
CONCACAF originally announced on July 23, 2015, that the play-off would be played as a single match on October 9, 2015, in the United States. After the conclusion of the 2015 CONCACAF Gold Cup on July 26, 2015, CONCACAF announced the Rose Bowl in Pasadena as the venue. The date was later amended to October 10 in order "to allow fans in attendance to enjoy a day-long of festivities, including Futbol Fiesta, a free, interactive fan zone outside the Rose Bowl."

Ticketing
On August 27, 2015, CONCACAF announced the ticket allocation process for the match. Both the United States Soccer Federation and the Mexican Football Federation received 30% of the tickets each, which was distributed through supporter groups. Another 30% was sold through a lottery where the general public could apply. The final 10% was given to local teams and sponsors. This system was to prevent the crowd being dominated by either team's supporters despite being on U.S. soil similar to previous Gold Cup finals.

Squads
Each team could select up to 23 players for their squads. On September 15, 2015, CONCACAF announced the provisional team lists. The final 23-player squads were announced by CONCACAF on October 5, 2015.

Mexico
On October 1, the final squad was announced.

Head coach:  Ricardo Ferretti

United States
On October 3, the final squad was announced. On October 9, it was announced that Bobby Wood would replace Alejandro Bedoya due to illness.

Head coach:  Jürgen Klinsmann

Match summary

Future and abolishment of Confederations Cup
A 2019 edition was initially planned, featuring the winners of the 2017 and 2019 tournaments. In November 2016, CONCACAF announced that the television rights for the 2019 edition have been sold to Fox Sports. On July 26, 2017, with their victory in the final of the 2017 CONCACAF Gold Cup, the United States ensured they would participate at a minimum in the 2019 CONCACAF Cup should they fail to win the 2019 CONCACAF Gold Cup.

However, on March 15, 2019, FIFA announced that the Confederations Cup would be abolished, with an expanded FIFA Club World Cup taking place instead. This therefore also meant there would be no future editions of the CONCACAF Cup.

References

External links
2015 CONCACAF Cup 
CONCACAF website

CONCACAF competitions
2015–16 in CONCACAF football
United States men's national soccer team matches
United States at the FIFA Confederations Cup
Soccer in California
Mexico national football team matches
2015 in American soccer
2015–16 in Mexican football
October 2015 sports events in the United States
2015 in sports in California
Sports competitions in Pasadena, California
Mexico–United States soccer rivalry
International association football competitions hosted by the United States
21st century in Pasadena, California
Defunct international association football competitions in North America
Recurring sporting events established in 2015
Recurring events disestablished in 2015
2015 establishments in North America
2015 disestablishments in North America